X-plane may refer to:

 X-planes, a series of US experimental aircraft
 X-Plane (simulator), a flight simulator for personal computers